People's Coop or People's Co-op or variation, may refer to:

 People's Food Co-op, of Portland, Oregon, USA; an organization
 People's Co-op Building, in Lehi, Utah, USA; an NRHP listed building

See also
 Cooperative
 List of co-operatives
 Co-operative Party (disambiguation)
 Coop (disambiguation), including co-op
 Credit union
 Trade union / labor union
 Communism
 Socialism
 Marxism
 Communist party (disambiguation)
 Socialist party (disambiguation)
 Peoples (disambiguation)